Bethel School District No. 403 is a public school district in Pierce County, Washington, USA and serves  of unincorporated Pierce County including Spanaway, Graham, Kapowsin and the city of Roy. Bethel was unique in the way that its high schools served grades 10-12 as opposed to the traditional grades of 9-12 of many other districts. In September 2011,  Bethel School District planned to switch to a traditional 9-12 district, which occurred in the 2012-2013 school year.

As of May 2013, the district had an enrollment of 17,642 students. The superintendent is Tom Seigel, who became the district's leader in 2001.

Boundary
The district includes:

Elk Plain, Roy, South Creek, Spanaway. It also includes the majority of the following: Frederickson, Graham, and Kapowsin. Additionally, it has portions of Clover Creek, Fort Lewis, McChord Field, Parkland, South Hill, and Summit View.

Schools

High schools

Bethel High School 
Challenger Secondary School 
Graham-Kapowsin High School 
Spanaway Lake High School

Middle and junior high schools

Bethel Middle School 
Cedarcrest Middle School 
Cougar Mountain Middle School 
Frontier Junior High School 
Spanaway Middle School 
Liberty Middle School

Elementary schools

Camas Prairie Elementary School
Centennial Elementary School 
Clover Creek Elementary School 
Elk Plain School of Choice 
Evergreen Elementary School 
Frederickson Elementary School
Graham Elementary School 
Kapowsin Elementary School
Naches Trail Elementary School 
Nelson Elementary School 
North Star Elementary School
Pioneer Valley Elementary School 
Roy Elementary School 
Rocky Ridge Elementary School 
Shining Mountain Elementary School 
Spanaway Elementary School 
Thompson Elementary School

See also 
 Bethel School District v. Fraser

Sources

External links
Bethel School District No. 403

School districts in Washington (state)
Education in Pierce County, Washington